Subota or Subbota (Cyrillic: Субота or Суббота) means Saturday in several Slavic languages. It may refer to
Lazareva Subota, a Serbian Orthodox tradition
Subota Jović, 17th century Habsburg military officer of Serbian origin
Aliaksandr Subota (born 1984), Paralympian athlete from Belarus 
Minja Subota  (1938-2021), Serbian composer, musician, entertainer and photographer

See also
Subbotin
Subbotnik